Joshua Benjamin Lester (born July 17, 1994) is an American professional baseball utility infielder in the Baltimore Orioles organization. He made his MLB debut in 2022 for the Detroit Tigers.

Amateur career
A native of Columbus, Georgia, Lester was part of the Columbus team that won the 2006 Little League World Series. After the win he was interviewed by ESPN's Erin Andrews and was in tears. Lester went on to attend Columbus High School, and played college baseball at the University of Missouri. In 2014, he played collegiate summer baseball with the Yarmouth–Dennis Red Sox of the Cape Cod Baseball League.

Professional career
Lester was drafted by the Detroit Tigers in the thirteenth round of the 2015 MLB draft and signed. After signing, he went on the play for the Gulf Coast Tigers, Connecticut Tigers and the West Michigan Whitecaps in 2015. He alternated between Connecticut and West Michigan in 2016. Lester was promoted to the Lakeland Tigers from West Michigan in 2017. He was promoted to the Erie SeaWolves in 2018 and alternated between them and the Toledo Mud Hens in 2019 and again in 2021 after missing the 2020 season due to the COVID-19 pandemic.

Detroit Tigers 
Lester spent most of 2022 season in Toledo before his contract was selected by the Tigers on September 4 to replace an injured Miguel Cabrera, who was being placed on the IL. He made his Major League debut the next day. He was sent outright to Triple-A on November 9, 2022. He elected free agency on November 10, 2022.

Baltimore Orioles 
On December 6, 2022, Lester signed a minor league contract with the Baltimore Orioles.

References

External links

1994 births
Living people
Baseball players from Columbus, Georgia
Connecticut Tigers players
Detroit Tigers players
Erie SeaWolves players
Gulf Coast Tigers players
Lakeland Flying Tigers players
Major League Baseball infielders
Missouri Tigers baseball players
Toledo Mud Hens players
West Michigan Whitecaps players
Yarmouth–Dennis Red Sox players